The NYSE Arca Gold BUGS Index is a modified equal dollar weighted index of companies involved in gold mining. BUGS stands for Basket of Unhedged Gold Stocks. It is also referred to by its ticker symbol "HUI".

Overview
The HUI Index and Philadelphia Gold and Silver Index (XAU) are the two most watched gold indices on the market. The main difference between them is that the HUI Index takes into account only gold producer stocks whereas the XAU Index includes both gold and silver producers. The Gold BUGS Index was designed to provide significant exposure to near term movements in gold prices by including companies that do not hedge their gold production beyond 1.5 years. The HUI Index was developed with a base value of 200.00 as of March 15, 1996. The NYSE Arca Gold BUGS Index currently consists of 15 of the largest and most widely held public gold production companies. Since bottoming in late 2000, HUI went on to be the top-performing US stock sector of the decade, rising by about 1600%.

Index components

Adjustments are made quarterly after the close of trading on the third Friday of March, June, September, and December so that each component stock represents its assigned weight in the index.

HUI-gold ratio
The HUI-gold ratio is an expression which compares the relative quantities of the NYSE Gold BUGS Index and the price of gold. The ratio is calculated by dividing the value of the NYSE Gold BUGS Index by the price of gold.

Investors use the HUI-gold ratio to illustrate the ever-shifting relative strength of the gold stocks versus gold.

See also
 American Stock Exchange
 Gold as an investment
 Philadelphia Gold and Silver Index

References

External links

Gold & Silver Exchange
Bloomberg Page For HUI:IND
NYSE Gold BUGS Index (^HUI) (Yahoo)

Gold mining
American stock market indices
Stock market indices by industry